Atlantis is the fourteenth studio album by German schlager singer Andrea Berg. It was released on 6 September 2013 in Germany, Austria, and Switzerland.

Background and artwork 

Atlantis is a double album. The first CD features songs composed and produced by Dieter Bohlen, who also worked on Andrea Berg's two previous albums Schwerelos (2010) and Abenteuer (2011), while the second CD includes contributions by various other songwriters and producers such as David Brandes and DJ BoBo.

According to Berg, the Atlantis theme was chosen as a continuation of her previous album Abenteuer, for which she used metaphors related to sea adventures and pirates. She also associates the island with freedom. The pictures used for the cover and booklet of Atlantis were taken by English underwater photographer Zena Holloway, who also worked with numerous other personalities such as Katie Price, singers Kylie Minogue and Rita Ora, or swimmer Jessica Hardy. Berg trained for four weeks to be able to hold her breath long enough for the photoshoot.

Track listing 

All tracks on the CD 1 are written by Andrea Berg and Dieter Bohlen and produced by Bohlen.

Notes
 "Das kann kein Zufall sein" (English: "That Cannot Be a Coincidence") uses the melody of "Call My Name", originally performed in 2011 by Deutschland sucht den Superstar winner Pietro Lombardi.
 The DVD is included both in the Premium Edition, which features the standard double album, and in the Geschenk-Edition.

Charts

Weekly charts

Year-end charts

See also 

 List of number-one hits of 2013 (Germany)
 List of number-one hits of 2013 (Austria)
 List of number-one hits of 2013 (Switzerland)

External links 

 Andrea Berg's official website 
 Zena Holloway's official website

References 

2013 albums
Andrea Berg albums
Ariola Records albums